George Albert "Jay" Keyworth II (G. A. Keyworth) (November 11, 1939 – August 23, 2017) was an American physicist who served as White House Science Advisor from 1981 to January 1986. He was a board member of Hewlett-Packard who was asked to step down in light of the controversy surrounding disclosure of sensitive information to the media.  He resigned on September 13, 2006.

Career 

He received a PhD in physics from Duke University in 1968.  Following the granting of his degree, he took a position at Los Alamos National Laboratory, where he rose to become leader of the Physics Division, the position he held when he was asked to become the presidential Science Advisor.

Keyworth has been chairman and senior fellow with The Progress & Freedom Foundation since 1995.

Keyworth was also on the board of directors for Eon Corporation (formally known as TV Answer) from 1990 to 1994. He worked as a liaison between TV Answer and Hewlett-Packard which eventually led to a manufacturing and marketing partnership between the two companies that was designed to speed the development of the first national interactive television system. Keyworth facilitated the agreement between HP and TV Answer to manufacture and market interactive television home units that would activate and control TV Answer’s two-way system in the home.

He was Science Advisor to the President and director of the White House's Office of Science and Technology Policy from 1981 to early 1986. He also served as a director of General Atomics.

Hewlett-Packard resignation 
In early 2005, after news leaks about then-CEO Carly Fiorina's clashes with the board surfaced, Fiorina hired a law firm to find the source.  In February 2005, Fiorina left the company and Patricia Dunn, non-executive chairwoman, continued the investigation.  As part of a larger scandal, a subcontractor used pretexting to expose Keyworth as the source of an alleged additional leak to CNET, and he was outed at a May 18, 2006 board meeting.  At the meeting, Dunn asked Keyworth to resign, he refused asserting that he was not the source of any unauthorized or inappropriate communication with reporters, and another board member (Tom Perkins) resigned over the way Keyworth was being treated.  HP revealed the story on September 6, 2006 and said that they were not seeking Keyworth's reelection to the board. Coinciding with Mark V. Hurd's promotion to chairman, Keyworth resigned on September 12.  In connection with Keyworth's resignation, HP made the following statement regarding the alleged CNET leak: "At HP's request, Dr. Keyworth often had contacts with the press to explain HP's interests. The board does not believe that Dr. Keyworth's contact with CNET in January 2006 was vetted through appropriate channels, but also recognizes that his discussion with the CNET reporter was undertaken in an attempt to further HP's interests. HP board chairman Patricia Dunn expressed regret for the intrusion into his privacy."

Keyworth had been a director of HP since 1986 and, until his resignation, was the longest-serving director at the company.

Death
Keyworth died at his home in Monterey, California of prostate cancer on August 23, 2017 at the age of 77.

See also 
 Tom Perkins

References

External links
Interview with George Keyworth about Star Wars Program from the Dean Peter Krogh Foreign Affairs Digital Archives

1939 births
2017 deaths
American nuclear physicists
Duke University alumni
Hewlett-Packard people
Los Alamos National Laboratory personnel
Yale University alumni
People from Boston
Directors of the Office of Science and Technology Policy